Malacoctenus triangulatus, the saddled blenny, is a species of labrisomid blenny fish native to the Atlantic Ocean as well as the Gulf of Mexico and the Caribbean Sea from southern Florida to the coast of Brazil. This species can reach a length of  TL. It can also be found in the aquarium trade.

References

External links
 

triangulatus
Fish of the Caribbean
Fish described in 1959
Taxa named by Victor G. Springer